Metamorphosis of Vivaldi's Four Seasons is a musical piece featuring guitarist Uli Jon Roth's interpretation of Antonio Vivaldi's work The Four Seasons, in a rock-classical fusion. The album also includes a new concerto, "Metamorphosis". "Metamorphosis" is separated into 24 tracks bridged by soundscapes and narration. It was released in Europe and Japan in 2003, and in North America in 2004.

Track listing

2-13 The Four Seasons by Antonio Vivaldi (Arranged and orchestrated by U.J.R.)
14-24 Metamorphosis by Uli Jon Roth

Personnel
Sky Guitar - Uli Jon Roth
SKY ORCHESTRA - Section Leaders:
1st Violin - Stephen Bentley-Klein
2nd Violin - Brian Wright
Viola - Giles Francis
Cello - Nick Holland
Contrabass - Lucy Shaw
Harpsichord - Don Airey
Timpani and percussion - Chris Lowe
Narration - Uli Jon Roth

References

2003 albums
Uli Jon Roth albums